The 9th National Games of China was a multi-sport event that was held in Guangzhou, Guangdong Province, China from 11–25 November 2001.

The main stadium for the games was the Guangdong Olympic Stadium. A total of 345 events were contested in 30 sports – 27 were summer sports and the remaining three were skating winter sports. The games featured 8608 athletes from 45 delegations, including the various Chinese provinces and regions as well as occupational divisions (e.g. People's Liberation Army, China Railway Corporation). The CCP General Secretary and President of China Jiang Zemin officially opened the games at the opening ceremony.

The ninth national games were hosted soon after Beijing had been successful in its host bid for the 2008 Summer Olympics. As a result, many prominent international guests were invited to the games in Guangzhou, including IOC president Jacques Rogge. The international dimension of the games was increased in comparison to previous years as many of the delegations had appointed foreign-born coaches and foreign referees were invited to the event to improve impartiality judge-based sports. High performances levels were achieved in a number of sports: seven women's weightlifting world records were broken, six Asian records were beaten in swimming, cycling and athletics, and a total of 37 Chinese national records were set during the 15-day competition.

Participating delegations

Sports
There were a total of 30 sports at the 9th National Games.

  Diving
  Swimming
  Synchronized swimming
  Water polo

 Artistic gymnastics
 Rhythmic gymnastics

 Figure skating
 Short speed skating
 Long speed skating

Medal table

References 

Medal table
广东代表团成为新霸主--第九届全国运动会最终奖牌榜 (Ninth National Games Final Medal Table) . Sohu Sports. Retrieved on 2013-03-27.
Results
第9届全国运动会各项比赛前三名 (9th National Games Medalists). jx918. Retrieved on 2013-03-27.

External links
Official website (archived)
9th National Games results (partially archived)
Moments at the Games from People Daily
Academic study of impact of Games on physical culture in China

 
National Games of China
National Games of China
2001 in Chinese sport
Sports competitions in Guangzhou